John de Vries (born 3 April 1966, New South Wales, Australia) is a former driver in the Indy Racing League and Australian Formula Holden.  He raced in the 2002 IRL season, where he began the season with Brayton Racing. De Vries competed in the first three races, and arrived but withdrew from the Nazareth Speedway race. He attempted to qualify for the 2002 Indianapolis 500, but was not among the 33 drivers who made the field. He returned after the Indianapolis 500 to compete in the Chevy 500 at Texas Motor Speedway and logged his best career IRL finish, an 11th place, in what would be his final IRL race. Previously, de Vries had spent four years in Formula Holden and the Australian Formula Ford Championship.

De Vries spent his youth in Newport Beach, California. Prior to beginning his racing career, he owned several Subway restaurants in California, the first of which was in Corona del Mar. While in Australia for business reasons, he developed an interest in racing.

Racing record

Career summary

American Open-Wheel
(key)

IndyCar

References

External links
John de Vries statistics at ChampCarStats.com

1966 births
Australian IndyCar Series drivers
Living people
Racing drivers from New South Wales

PDM Racing drivers